John Morehead Brower (July 19, 1845August 5, 1913) was a Representative from North Carolina.

Biography
Brower was born in Greensboro, Guilford County, North Carolina on July 19, 1845, but soon moved to Surry County with his parents, who settled in Mount Airy in 1845. He was educated by private tutors and attended the Mount Airy Male Academy and engaged in agricultural pursuits, the raising and processing of tobacco, and mercantile pursuits.

Brower was delegate to all Republican State conventions from 1872 to 1896 and a member of the North Carolina State Senate from 1876 to 1878. He was elected as a Republican to the Fiftieth and Fifty-first Congresses (March 4, 1887 – March 3, 1891), where he was chairman of the Committee on Expenditures in the Post Office Department (Fifty-first Congress). He was an unsuccessful candidate for reelection in 1890 to the Fifty-second Congress, but then became a member of the North Carolina House of Representatives from 1896 to 1898, later resuming his former agricultural and business pursuits.

Brower moved to Oklahoma and settled in Boswell, Choctaw County, in 1907 and engaged in the manufacture of lumber, agricultural pursuits, and stock raising. He died in Paris, Lamar County, Texas, August 5, 1913 and was interred in Oakdale Cemetery, Mount Airy, North Carolina.

References

1913 deaths
1845 births
Republican Party members of the United States House of Representatives from North Carolina
Republican Party North Carolina state senators
Republican Party members of the North Carolina House of Representatives
19th-century American politicians